Lars Haltbrekken (born 9 March 1971) is a Norwegian environmentalist and was elected to the Parliament of Norway in 2017 for the Socialist Left Party. He was chairman of Friends of the Earth Norway from 2005 to 2016 after having been deputy chairman from 2003 to 2005. Haltbrekken was also chairman of Natur og Ungdom in 1995 and 1996. In between the two leaderships he worked primarily trying to prevent natural gas power plants in Norway, and was chairman of Fellesaksjonen mot gasskraftverk. He grew up in Trondheim.

Politics

Parliament 
Haltbrekken was elected to the Storting in 2017 and was re-elected in 2021.

Party politics 
In February 2023, ahead of the party convention, the Socialist Party committee was divided on whether or not to designate Haltbrekken or Marian Hussein to become deputy leader succeeding Kirsti Bergstø who was the sole candidate to succeed outgoing leader Audun Lysbakken. Despite being considered the favourite to become deputy leader, he lost against Hussein with 101 to 114 votes.

References

1971 births
Living people
Norwegian environmentalists
Nature and Youth activists